Joseon diplomacy was the foreign policy of the Joseon dynasty of Korea from 1392 through 1910; and its theoretical and functional foundations were rooted in Neo-Confucian scholar-bureaucrats, institutions and philosophy.

Taejo of Joseon established the "Kingdom of Great Joseon" in 1392-1393, and he founded the Joseon dynasty which would retain power on the Korean peninsula for five hundred years. As an initial step, a diplomatic mission was dispatched to China and to Japan in 1402. Subsequent missions developed and nurtured the contacts and exchanges between these neighboring countries.

A diplomatic mission conventionally consisted of three envoys—the main envoy, the vice-envoy, and a document official. Also included were one or more official writers or recorders who created a detailed account of the mission.

In the 20th century, the Joseon dynasty's bilateral relations were affected by the increasing numbers of international contacts which required adaptation and a new kind of diplomacy.

Diplomacy with China

Although the Joseon dynasty considered 1392 as the foundation of the Joseon kingdom, Imperial China did not immediately acknowledge the new government on the Korean peninsula. In 1401, the Ming court recognized Joseon as a tributary state in its sino-centric schema of foreign relations. In 1403, the Yongle Emperor conveyed a patent and a gold seal to Taejong of Joseon, thus confirming his status and that of his dynasty.

An early achievement of the new monarch was improved relations with China; Joseon had its origin in General Yi's refusal to attack China in response to raids from Chinese bandits.

Diplomacy with Japan

As an initial step, a diplomatic mission was dispatched to Japan in 1402. The Joseon envoy sought to bring about the re-establishment of amicable relations between the two countries and he was charged to commemorate the good relations which existed in ancient times. This mission was successful, and shōgun Ashikaga Yoshimitsu was reported to have been favorably impressed by this initial embassy. Not less than 70 diplomatic missions were dispatched from the Joseon capital to Japan before the beginning of Japan's Edo period.

Reciprocal missions were construed as a means of communication between Korean kings and Japanese shōguns of almost equal ranking. The emperors of Japan at the time were figureheads with no actual political or military power and the actual political and military rulers of Japan that Joseon communicated with were the shoguns who were represented as "tycoon of Japan" in many foreign communications in order to avoid the conflict with the Sinocentric world order in which the emperor of China was the highest authority, and all rulers of tributary states were known as "kings".

Gyorin diplomacy with other nations
The Joseon dynasty employed the gyorin (kyorin) (neighborly relations) diplomacy in dealings with Jurchen, Japan, Ryukyu Kingdom, Siam and Java. Gyorin was applied to a multi-national foreign policy. The unique nature of these bilateral diplomatic exchanges evolved from a conceptual framework developed by the Chinese. Gradually, the theoretical models would be modified, mirroring the evolution of a unique relationship.

List of Joseon diplomatic envoys

 Pak Tong-chi
 Yeo Ui-son
 Yun Myeong (Yun Myǒng)
 Yang Su (diplomat) 
 Bak Bun 
 Song Hui-gyeong (Song Hǔi-gyǒng)
 Bak Hui-jung (Pak Hǔi-chung)
 Pak An-sin
 Bak Seo-saeng (Pak Sǒ-saeng)
 Yi Ye
 Go Deuk-jong (Ko Tǔk-chong)
 Byeon Hyo-mun
 Hwang Yun-gil
 Hwang Sin

 Samyeongdang (Yu jeong)
 Yeo U-gil (Yŏ Ugil)
 O Yun-gyeom (O Yun'gyŏm)
 Jeong Rip (Chŏng Ip)
 Im Gwang (Im Kwang)
 Yun Sunji
 Jo Hyeong (Cho Hyŏng)
 Yun Chiwan
 Jo Tae-eok (Cho T'aeŏk)
 Hong Chi-jung (Hong Ch'ijung)
 Hong Gye-hui (Hong Kyehǔi)
 Jo Eom (Cho Ŏm)
 Kim Igyo

Recognition in the West
The historical significance of some of these scholar-bureaucrats were confirmed when their missions and their names were specifically mentioned in a widely distributed history published by the Oriental Translation Fund in 1834.

In the West, early published accounts of the Joseon kingdom are not extensive, but they are found in Sangoku Tsūran Zusetsu (published in Paris in 1832), and in Nihon Ōdai Ichiran (published in Paris in 1834). Joseon foreign relations and diplomacy are explicitly referenced in the 1834 work; and some of the diplomats names are also identified.

See also
 Goryeo missions to Imperial China
 Joseon missions to Japan
 Joseon tongsinsa
 Japan-Korea Treaty of 1876 (Treaty of Ganghwa)
 Korean Empire

References

Citations

Sources 
 Daehwan, Noh.  "The Eclectic Development of Neo-Confucianism and Statecraft from the 18th to the 19th Century," Korea Journal (Winter 2003). 
 Goodrich, L. Carrington and Zhaoying Fang. (1976).  Dictionary of Ming biography, 1368-1644 (明代名人傳), Vol. I;  Dictionary of Ming biography, 1368-1644 (明代名人傳), Vol. II. New York: Columbia University Press. ; ;  OCLC 1622199
  한일관계사연구논집편찬위원회. (2005). 통신사・왜관과한일관계 (Han Il kwangyesa yŏngu nonjip, Vol. 6). 경인문화사. .
 Kang, Etsuko Hae-jin. (1997). Diplomacy and Ideology in Japanese-Korean Relations: from the Fifteenth to the Eighteenth Century. Basingstoke, Hampshire; Macmillan. ; 
 Kang, Jae-eun and Suzanne Lee. (2006). The Land of Scholars : Two Thousand Years of Korean Confucianism. Paramus, New Jersey: Homa & Sekey Books. ; OCLC 60931394
 Kang, Woong Joe. (2005). The Korean Struggle for International Identity in the Foreground of the Shufeldt Negotiation, 1866-1882. Latham, Maryland: University Press of America. ;  OCLC 238760185
 Lee, Sang Oak and Duk-Soo Park. (1998). Perspectives on Korea. Honolulu: University of Hawaii Press. ; 
 Palais, James B. (1995). Confucian Statecraft and Korean Institutions: Yu Hyŏngwŏn and the late Chosŏn Dynasty. Seattle: University of Washington Press. ; 
 Titsingh, Isaac. (1834).  Annales des empereurs du Japon (Nihon Odai Ichiran). Paris: Royal Asiatic Society, Oriental Translation Fund of Great Britain and Ireland. OCLC 5850691.
 Walraven, Boudewijn and Remco E. Breuker. (2007). Korea in the middle: Korean studies and area studies; Essays in Honour of Boudewijn Walraven. Leiden: CNWS Publications. ; 
 Wiwŏnhoe, Yunesŭkʻo Hanʼguk. (2004). Korean History: Discovery of Its Characteristics and Developments. Elizabeth, New Jersey: Hollym. ;

External links
 Joseon Tongsinsa Cultural Exchange Association ; 
 조선통신사연구 (Journal of Studies in Joseon Tongsinsa) 

Foreign relations of the Joseon dynasty
Diplomacy